Biological Psychology is a peer-reviewed academic journal covering biological psychology published by Elsevier.

The editor-in-chief is Ottmar V. Lipp (University of Queensland). Biological Psychology publishes research on the biological aspects of psychological states and processes, including electrophysiology, biochemical assessments during psychological experiments, and biologically induced changes in psychological function.

Abstracting and indexing 
According to the Journal Citation Reports, the journal has a 2018 impact factor of 2.627. It is abstracted and indexed in Pubmed, Web of Science, Psychological Abstracts, BIOSIS, Chemical Abstracts, Current Contents/Social & Behavioral Sciences, EMBASE, Elsevier BIOBASE, MEDLINE, Scopus, and the Social Sciences Citation Index.

References

External links 
 

English-language journals
Elsevier academic journals
Neuroscience journals
Personality journals
Publications established in 1973
9 times per year journals